Andamia heteroptera is a species of combtooth blenny found in the eastern Indian Ocean, around Christmas Island. This species reaches a maximum length of  SL.

References

heteroptera
Fish described in 1857